Bobby Leopold (born October 18, 1957 in Port Arthur, Texas) is a former American football linebacker who played five seasons in the NFL, mainly for the San Francisco 49ers. He has also played with the Green Bay Packers and the New Jersey Generals of the USFL.

1957 births
Living people
American football linebackers
Notre Dame Fighting Irish football players
San Francisco 49ers players
Green Bay Packers players
New Jersey Generals players
Players of American football from Texas